Playa Pascual was a seaside town in the Ciudad la Plata area of San José Department of southern Uruguay. In 2004 it had a population of 5,653. It is connected to Montevideo in the southeast by Route 1. Santa Mónica lies just to the northeast. Both Playa Pascual and Santa Mónica, along with other populated segments, were integrated into the Ciudad del Plata in 2006.

References

External links
INE map of Playa Pascual

Populated places in the San José Department
Beaches of Uruguay
Populated coastal places in Uruguay